Charles Enderlin (born 1945) is a French-Israeli journalist, specialising in the Middle East and Israel. He is the author of a number of books on the subject, including Shamir, une biographie (1991), Shattered Dreams: The Failure of the Peace Process in the Middle East, 1995–2002 (2002), and The Lost Years: Radical Islam, Intifada and Wars in the Middle East 2001–2006 (2007). He was awarded France's highest decoration, the Légion d'honneur, in August 2009.

Enderlin came to international public attention in September 2000, when he provided the voice-over for a France 2 report on the killing of 12-year-old boy Muhammad al-Durrah by soldiers of the Israeli army. The event was important at the start of the Second Intifada. A few months after Enderlin's report, a small group of people in France (Gérard Huber, Philippe Karsenty, Luc Rosenzweig) contested the origin of the bullets that killed al-Durrah and alleged that the scene was staged. France 2 sued Karsenty for libel. Karsenty was eventually convicted of defamation in 2013 and fined €7,000.

Biography 
Enderlin was born in Paris in 1945, and grew up in Metz with his divorced mother, his sister, and his grandparents, a family of Austrian Jews who moved to France after the Anschluss. He studied medicine in Nancy, and moved to Israel in December 1968 at the age of 22 to live on a kibbutz.

In 1971, he became a journalist with an Israeli radio station. Two years later, he became correspondent of Radio Monte Carlo, and the next year, senior editor at the news department of Kol Yisrael. At the beginning of the 1970s, he acquired Israeli citizenship. 

In 1981, he became a correspondent with the French television channel Antenne 2 (now France 2), acquiring the title of grand reporter in 1988 ("grand reporter" is a senior title in the French media). Three years later, he became chief of the Israel bureau of France 2. As of 2005, he was also vice-president of the Association of Foreign Press Correspondents in Jerusalem.

He has studied and written extensively on the political and diplomatic process of normalisation between Israel and the Palestinian Authority, and wrote an overview of the negotiations in 1997, published as Paix ou guerre, les secrets des négociations israélo-arabes 1917–1997 ("Peace or War, the Secrets of Israeli–Palestinian Negotiations, 1917–1997").  

He was awarded the Chevalier de l'Ordre national de la Légion d'honneur on 12 August 2009.

In August 2015, he retired from his post in the Jerusalem office, and was replaced by Franck Genauzeau.

Muhammad al-Durrah reportage and lawsuits 

In September 2000, footage of the reported shooting in the Gaza Strip of a Palestinian boy, Muhammad al-Durrah, was broadcast by France 2. Narrating the footage, Enderlin stated that al-Durrah had been targeted and killed by shots fired from Israeli positions. He came under criticism from a number of commentators, including Philippe Karsenty, who claimed that the bullets that killed the boy were not fired by the Israeli army, and that Enderlin had helped stage the scene. France 2 sued Karsenty for libel. Karsenty was eventually convicted of defamation in 2013 and fined €7,000.

Books 
 Les Juifs de France entre république et sionisme, Le Seuil, 2020
 Le grand aveuglement : Israël et l'irrésistible ascension de l'islam radical, Albin Michel, 2009
 Par le feu et par le sang. Le combat clandestin pour l'indépendance d'Israël 1936–1948, Albin Michel, 2008
 The Lost Years: Radical Islam, Intifada and Wars in the Middle East 2001–2006 (trans. Suzanne Verderber) , Other Press 2007
 Les années perdues : Intifada et guerres au Proche-Orient, 2001–2006 , Fayard 2006
 Shattered Dreams: The Failure of the Peace Process in the Middle East, 1995–2002  (2002)
(Le Rêve brisé : Histoire de l'échec du processus de paix au Proche-Orient (1995–2002))
 1997: Paix ou guerre,les secrets des négociations israélo-arabes 1917–1997 (éd.Stock)
 Shamir, une biographie (1991)

See also

 Camp David 2000 Summit
 Israeli–Palestinian conflict
 Pallywood
 Proposals for a Palestinian state

References

External links
 jewishjournal.com Shattered Dreams Book Review
 Interview With Charles Enderlin
 La haine envers Charles Enderlin, correspondent de France 2 à Jérusalem : Pourquoi ?

1945 births
Living people
Writers from Metz
20th-century French Jews
20th-century French journalists
Israeli journalists
French male journalists
French emigrants to Israel
21st-century French journalists
Israeli people of Austrian-Jewish descent
French people of Austrian-Jewish descent
Journalists from Paris
Jewish journalists
21st-century French Jews
Chevaliers of the Légion d'honneur